The Archdiocese of Glasgow was one of the thirteen (after 1633 fourteen) dioceses of the Scottish church. It was the second largest diocese in the Kingdom of Scotland, including Clydesdale, Teviotdale, parts of Tweeddale, Liddesdale, Annandale, Nithsdale, Cunninghame, Kyle, and Strathgryfe, as well as Lennox, Carrick and the part of Galloway known as Desnes.

Glasgow became an archbishopric in 1492, eventually securing the dioceses of Galloway, Argyll and the Isles as suffragans. The Scottish church broke its allegiance to Rome in 1560, but bishops continued intermittently until 1689.

History 
The diocese of Glasgow became important in the 12th century. It was organized by King David I of Scotland and John, Bishop of Glasgow. There had been an earlier religious site the exact age of which is unknown. According to doubtful hagiographical tradition, this ecclesiastical site had been established by Saint Kentigern. The bishopric became one of the largest and wealthiest in the Kingdom of Scotland, bringing wealth and status to the town. Somewhere between 1175 and 1178 this position was strengthened even further when Bishop Jocelin obtained for the episcopal settlement the status of burgh from King William the Lion, allowing the settlement to expand with the benefits of trading monopolies and other legal guarantees. Sometime between 1189 and 1195 this status was supplemented by an annual fair, which survives to this day as the Glasgow Fair.

Until 1560, when practice of the Catholic Faith was suppressed by act of the Parliament of Scotland, nearly all the bishops of Glasgow took an active share in the government of the country; whether as chancellors or treasurers of the kingdom or as members of regency during the minority of a sovereign. Robert Wishart (consecrated 1272, d. 1316) was conspicuous for his patriotism during the Scottish War of Independence from England, and was the close friend of William Wallace and Robert Bruce. William Turnbull (consecrated 1447, d. 1454), obtained in 1450 from Pope Nicholas V the charter of foundation for the University of Glasgow.

On 9 January 1492, Pope Innocent VIII raised the see to metropolitan rank, attaching to it the suffragan dioceses of Argyle, Dunblane, Dunkeld, and Galloway. James Beaton, nephew of the celebrated Cardinal David Beaton, was the fourth and last archbishop of the old hierarchy.

In 1560, eight years after his nomination, he was forced to retire to France, where he acted as confidential agent of Mary, Queen of Scots, and later openly as ambassador for James VI, till his death in Paris, 25 April 1603. He carried away with him the diocesan records, two of which deserve special mention: (1) "Registrum Vetus Ecclesiae Cathedralis Glasguensis", in handwriting of the twelfth and thirteenth centuries, and (2) "Liber Ruber Ecclesiae Glasguensis", with entries from about 1400 to 1476. These, along with other records, were in 1843 printed in a volume for the Maitland Club under the title: "Registrum Episcopatus Glasguensis: Munimenta Ecclesiae Metropolitanae Glasguensis a sede restauratâ saeculo ineunte XII ad reformatam religionem". A more splendid memorial of those times still remains in the old cathedral of St. Mungo, which was begun by Bishop Jocelyn (consecrated 1175, d. 1199) and received its last additions from Archbishop Blackader (consecr. 1484, d. 1508).

Restoration

In 1828, as part of the Restoration of the Scottish hierarchy, the Holy See erected the Western District or Vicariate of Scotland, and the first vicar Apostolic to reside in Glasgow was Andrew Scott, Bishop of Eretria (b. 1772, d, 1846). He was succeeded by John Murdoch, Bishop of Castabala (b. 1796, d. 1865) and John Gray, Bishop of Hypsopolis (b. 1817, d. 1872). On the resignation of Bishop Gray in 1869 Charles Petre Eyre (b. 1817, d. 1902) was consecrated Archbishop of Anazarba and appointed administrator Apostolic. On the Restoration of the Scottish hierarchy by Pope Leo XIII, 4 March 1878, the Archbishopric of Glasgow was re-established, and Archbishop Eyre was transferred to the restored see.

Bishops and archbishops

Parishes 
Parishes listed by deanery:

Annandale
 
 Annan
 Applegarth
 Brydekirk (St Brigit)
 Carruthers
 Castlemilk
 Corrie
 Cummertrees
 Dalton Magna
 Dalton Parva
 Dornock
 Dryfesdale (St Cuthbert)
 Ecclefechan
 Gretna
 Hoddom
 Hutton Magna
 Hutton Parva
 Johnstone
 Kirkconnell (St Connall) independent parsonage
 Kirkpatrick Fleming (St Patrick)
 Kirkpatrick Juxta (St Patick)
 Lochmaben
 Luce
 Middlebie
 Moffat
 Mouswald
 Pennersaughs
 Redkirk (St Patrick)
 Ruthwell
 Sibbaldbie (St James)
 Trailtrow
 Tundergarth
 Wamphray

Carrick
 
 Ballantrae (St Cuthbert)
 Colmonell or Kilcolmonell (St Colmán Elo)
 Dailly (St Ciaran)
 Girvan
 Kirkbride (St Brigit)
 Kirkmichael (St Michael)
 Kirkoswald (St Oswald)
 Maybole
 Straiton

Dessenes
 
 Colmonell (St Colmán Elo)
 Colvend
 Kirkbean (St Bean)
 Kirkbride or Blaikit (St Brigit)
 Kirkgunzeon (St Finian)
 Kirkpatrick Durham (St Patrick)
 Kirkpatrick Irongray (St Patrick)
 Lochrutton
 New Abbey
 Southwick
 Terregles
 Urr (St Constantine)

Eskdale
 
 Canonbie
 Eskdalemuir
 Ewes (St Martin)
 Kirkandrews on Esk (St Andrew)
 Overkirk of Ewes (St Cuthbert)
 Staplegorton
 Wauchope
 Westerkirk

Kyle and Cunningham
 
 Ardrossan
 Auchinleck
 Ayr
 Barnweill
 Beith
 Coylton
 Craigie
 Cumbrae
 Dalmellington
 Dalry
 Dalrymple
 Dreghorn
 Dundonald (St Giles)
 Dunlop
 Fenwick
 Galston
 Irvine
 Kilbirnie (St Brendan)
 Kilmarnock (St Ernan)
 Kilmaurs (St Maura)
 Kilwinning
 Largs (St Columba)
 Loudoun
 Mauchline
 Monkton (St Cuthbert)
 New Cumnock
 Ochiltree
 Old Cumnock
 Pierston
 Prestwick St Nicholas (St Nicholas)
 Riccarton
 St Quivox
 Stevenson (St Monachus)
 Stewarton
 Symington
 Tarbolton
 West Kilbride (St Brigit)

Lanark
 
 Biggar
 Carluke (St Loesuc ?)
 Carmichael (St Michael ?)
 Carnwath
 Carstairs
 Covington
 Crawford (St Constantine)
 Crawfordjohn
 Culter
 Dolphinton
 Douglas
 Dunsyre
 East Kilbride (St Brigit)
 Lamington (St Finian ?)
 Lanark (St Kentigern)
 Lesmahagow (St Fechin)
 Libberton
 Nemphlar
 Pettinain
 Quothquhan
 Roberton
 Stonehouse
 Symington
 Thankerton (St John)
 Walston
 Wandel
 Wiston

Lennox
 
 Antermony
 Baldernock
 Balfron
 Bonhill
 Buchanan (St Kentigern)
 Campsie
 Cardross
 Drymen (St Columba ?)
 Dumbarton
 Fintry
 Killearn
 Kilmaronock (St Ronan)
 Kilsyth
 Kirkintilloch
 Luss (St Kessog)
 New Kilpatrick
 Old Kilpatrick
 Rhu
 Rosneath
 Strathblane

Nithsdale
 
 Caerlaverock
 Closeburn (St Osbern ?)
 Dalgarnock
 Dumfries
 Dumgree
 Dunscore (St Cairbre)
 Durisdeer
 Garvald
 Glencairn
 Holywood
 Kirkbride (St Brigit)
 Kirkconnell (St Conall)
 Kirkmahoe (St Kentigern)
 Morton
 Penpont
 Sanquhar
 Tinwald
 Torthorwald
 Trailflat
 Troqueer
 Tynron

Peebles
 
 Broughton (St Lolan)
 Drumelzier
 Eddleston
 Ettrick
 Glenholm (St Cuthbert)
 Innerleithen
 Kailzie
 Kilbucho (St Beoga)
 Kirkurd
 Lyne
 Manor
 Newlands
 Peebles
 Skirling
 Stobo
 Traquair
 West Linton
 Yarrow (St Mary)

Rutherglen
 
 Avondale (St Mary)
 Blantyre
 Bothwell (St Bride)
 Cadder
 Cambuslang
 Cambusnethan
 Carmunnock
 Cathcart (St Oswald)
 Dalserf or Machanshire
 Dalziel
 Eaglesham
 Eastwood
 Erskine
 Glasgow (St Kentigern)
 Glassford
 Govan (St Constantine)
 Hamilton
 Houston (St Peter)
 Inchinnan
 Inverkip
 Kilbarchan (St Berchan)
 Killellan (St Fillan)
 Kilmacolm (St Columba)
 Lochwinnoch (St Finan)
 Mearns
 Neilston
 New Monkland
 Old Monkland
 Paisley (St Mirren)
 Pollock
 Port Glasgow
 Renfrew
 Rutherglen
 Shotts
 Torrance

Teviotdale
 
 Abbotrule
 Ancrum
 Ashkirk
 Bedrule
 Bowden
 Castletown (St Martin)
 Cavers Magna
 Cavers Parva
 Crailing
 Eckford
 Ettleton
 Galashiels
 Hassendean (St Kentigern)
 Hawick
 Hobkirk
 Hownam
 Jedburgh
 Kelso
 Lampitlaw
 Lilliesleaf
 Linton
 Longnewton
 Maxton
 Maxwell
 Melrose
 Minto
 Morebattle
 Mow
 Nisbet
 Old Roxburgh
 Oxnam
 Rankilburn
 Roxburgh (Holy Sepulchre)
 Roxburgh (St James)
 Selkirk Abbatis
 Selkirk Regis
 Southdean
 Sprouston
 St Boswells (St Bosil)
 Wheelkirk
 Wilton
 Yetholm

References

External links
Glasgow Cathedral Precinct  -  Provides an extensive history of the pre-Reformation diocese.

Christianity in Glasgow
Glasgow
1492 establishments in Scotland
1689 disestablishments in Scotland